This is the discography of hip hop group dead prez.

Studio albums

Live albums

Mixtapes

M-1 solo albums

stic.man solo albums

Collaboration albums

Singles

References

Discographies of American artists
Hip hop discographies